Wheels Up is a provider of "on demand" private aviation in the United States and one of the largest private aviation companies in the world. It was founded in 2013 by Kenny Dichter, using a membership/on-demand business model.

Business model
Wheels Up members can book private aircraft from the company fleet and third-party operators using a mobile application.

History 
The company was founded in 2013 by Kenny Dichter. The company announced its management team in August 2013. It confirmed a Beechcraft turboprop order for 105 King Air 350i aircraft in a transaction valued at US$1.4 billion, including maintenance. The company focuses on non-hub markets that commercial airlines service less effectively. Wheels Up's marketing strategy involves entertainment at major sports and cultural events for their VIP members throughout the year.

By 2014, the company had more than 1,000 members and had taken possession of 27 new King Airs and 10 fully refurbished Cessna Citation jets. After five years in business as a United States-only membership, the company had sold 5,379 individual and 379 corporate memberships and owned 72 King Airs and 20 Citations. Wheels Up also flies Beechcraft King Air 350i, which has good short field performance, cargo capacity and seats nine passengers.

Wheels Up was a sponsor of American Pharoah at the 2015 Belmont Stakes, when the Thoroughbred won the racing Triple Crown, and signed with the Miami Marlins as the team's Official Private Aviation Partner in 2018. The company has also been involved in philanthropic activities for National Breast Cancer Awareness Month, when it took delivery of a pink King Air 350i, and Ovarian Cancer Awareness Month. In February 2018, Wheels Up announced a new flight sharing membership called Wheels Up Connect. Connect members can access members' only community boards to share flights with full program members. The goal is to democratize private flying by making it more affordable. In June 2019, Wheels Up announced it had acquired Travel Management Company, referred to as TMC Jets, a charter operator with 24 light jets.

In September 2019, Wheels Up announced it had purchased Avianis, a B2B platform that streamlines communications between operators and brokers. On March 2, 2020, Wheels Up announced it had acquired Gama Aviation Signature, the largest Part 135 charter operators in the U.S. In April 2020, Wheels Up launched the "Meals Up" initiative with Russell Wilson and non-profit Feeding America to provide meals for those impacted by food insecurity. To date, Meals Up has donated over 80 Million meals to Feeding America.

Following its acquisitions of Delta Private Jets, Travel Management Company, Gama Aviation Signature, Mountain Aviation, and additional regional providers, Wheels Up Group is now the second-largest private aircraft operator in the U.S. behind NetJets.

In January 2022, Wheels Up announced it had reached an agreement to acquire Air Partner PLC (LSE: AIR), a U.K.-based global aviation services group with operations in 18 locations and across four continents.

Financing & initial public offering 

In January 2018, CEO Kenny Dichter announced on CNBC Squawk Box that the company had retained Bank of America and Goldman Sachs to explore "strategic initiatives.”

On December 9, 2019, Delta Air Lines announced it took a stake in Wheels Up, to become its largest investor and merge it in the first quarter of 2020 with its Delta Private Jets subsidiary, itself operating 70 business jets, for a 190 aircraft fleet.  On January 29, 2020, Wheels Up said its deal with Delta Air Lines to acquire Delta Private Jets had closed.

On July 14, 2021, Wheels Up became the first private aviation company to be publicly traded on the New York Stock Exchange  under the ticker symbol of $UP following a merger with special-purpose acquisition company, Aspirational Consumer Lifestyle Corp. in the second quarter.

See also
Fractional ownership of aircraft
AirSprint
Flexjet
NetJets
PlaneSense
VistaJet

References

Fractional aircraft ownership companies
2013 establishments in New York City
Aircraft leasing companies
Companies based in New York City
Companies established in 2013
Online companies of the United States
Companies listed on the New York Stock Exchange
Special-purpose acquisition companies
Air charter
Transportation companies based in New York City